Tactusa trigonifera is a moth of the family Erebidae first described by George Hampson in 1898. It is known from Assam in north-eastern India.

The wingspan is about 12 mm. The ground colour of the forewing is yellowish brown, with an acutely angled blackish patch in upper medial area, a blackish costal patch in the basal area and a black terminal area. Only the subterminal and terminal lines are marked, the former inwardly outlined by light yellow and the latter by interneural black spots. The hindwing is dark grey, with an indistinct discal spot and the underside is unicolorous grey.

References

Micronoctuini
Taxa named by Michael Fibiger
Moths described in 1898